North Carolina's 12th congressional district is a congressional district located in the northern and eastern portions of Charlotte as well as surrounding areas in Mecklenburg County and Cabarrus County represented by Democrat Alma Adams. Prior to the 2016 elections, it was a gerrymandered district located in central North Carolina that comprised portions of Charlotte, Winston-Salem, Greensboro, Lexington, Salisbury, Concord, and High Point.

It was one of two minority-majority Congressional districts created in the state in the 1990s. Between 2003 and 2013, there was a small plurality of white Americans in the district according to the 2000 United States Census, although African Americans made up a comparable proportion of the voting population.  As redrawn for the 2012 elections and under the lines used prior to the 2016 elections, the district had an African-American majority according to the 2010 United States Census. The 12th district is the most Democratic district in North Carolina, and it has never been represented by a Republican.

North Carolina had a twelfth seat in the House in the early nineteenth century (1803-1843) and in the mid-twentieth century (1943–1963). Most of the territory in the district's second incarnation is now in the 11th district.

Re-establishment from 1990 
The district was re-established after the 1990 United States Census, when North Carolina gained a House seat due to an increase in population. It was drawn in 1992 as one of two minority-majority districts, designed to give African-American voters (who comprised 22% of the state's population at the time) the chance to elect a representative of their choice; Section 2 of the Voting Rights Act prohibited the dilution of voting power of minorities by distributing them among districts so that they could never elect candidates of their choice.

In its original configuration, the district had a 64 percent African-American majority in population. The district boundaries, stretching from Gastonia to Durham, were so narrow at some points that it was no wider than a highway lane. It followed Interstate 85 almost exactly. One state legislator famously remarked, after seeing the district map, "if you drove down the interstate with both car doors open, you’d kill most of the people in the district."

The United States Supreme Court ruled in Shaw v. Reno (1993) that a racial gerrymander may, in some circumstances, violate the Equal Protection Clause of the United States Constitution.

The state legislature defended the two minority-majority districts as based on demographics, with the 12th representing people of the interior Piedmont area and the 1st the Coastal Plain. Subsequently, the 12th district was redrawn several times and was adjudicated in the Supreme Court on two additional occasions. The version created after the 2000 census was approved by the U.S. Supreme Court in Hunt v. Cromartie. The district's configuration dating from the 2000 census had a small plurality of whites, and it was changed only slightly after the 2010 census. African Americans make up a large majority of registered voters and Hispanics constitute 7.1% of residents.

On February 5, 2016, U.S. Circuit Judge Roger L. Gregory ruled that the district, along with North Carolina's 1st congressional district, must be redrawn from its post-2010 configuration, and that race could not be a mitigating factor in drawing the district. This decision, in the case of Cooper v. Harris, was subsequently upheld 5−3 by the U.S. Supreme Court in an opinion by Justice Elena Kagan on May 22, 2017. In the opinion, Justice Kagan noted that this marked the fifth time the 12th district had appeared before the Supreme Court, following Shaw v. Reno and Hunt v. Cromartie which had both been heard twice before the Court.

In all of its configurations, it has been a Democratic stronghold. Its previous incarnation was dominated by black voters in Charlotte, Greensboro, and Winston-Salem. The redrawn map made the 12th a compact district comprising nearly all of Mecklenburg County, except the southeast quadrant. Due to Charlotte's heavy swing to the Democrats in recent years, the reconfigured 12th is no less Democratic than its predecessor.

On February 23, 2022, the North Carolina Supreme Court approved a new map which changed the 12th district boundaries to include the northern half of Mecklenburg County, including most of Uptown, along with eastern Cabarrus County.

List of members representing the district

Recent election results

2002

2004

2006

2008

2010

2012

2014 (Special Election)

2014

2016

2018

2020

2022

See also 

North Carolina's congressional districts
List of United States congressional districts

References 

 
 
 Congressional Biographical Directory of the United States 1774–present

External links 
Mel Watt's official website

12